The Frome River  is an ephemeral river in the Australian state of South Australia located within the Lake Eyre basin.  Its source is near Mount Rose in the northern Flinders Ranges and it discharges into the south-eastern side of the northern part of Lake Eyre.  

The river was named by the British explorer, Edward John Eyre on 27 August 1840 after Captain Edward Frome who was the Surveyor General of South Australia at the time.

See also

Frome (disambiguation)

References

Rivers of South Australia
Lake Eyre basin
Far North (South Australia)